Luana is a feminine name of undetermined, multiple origins. It was among the top 10 most popular names for baby girls born in Peru in 2020. It is in use in other countries as well. It ranked among the top 50 names used for girls born in Portugal in recent years  and was among the top 200 names used for girls born in Italy between 1999 and 2006. It has ranked among the top 500 names given to girls born in France in recent years. There were 95 girls born in the United States in 2020 and 110 girls in 2021 who were given the name. It has also been well used in Switzerland, ranking among the top 30 names for girls in 2020. It also ranked among the top 100 names for girls born in Germany in 2018 and among the top 1,000 names for girls born in the United Kingdom in 2019.

Origins 
Usage of the name might have been inspired by characters in theatrical productions and films. It was the name of the Polynesian heroine in the 1932 film Bird of Paradise, which was based on a 1912 play. Luana is also a character in the 1982 Italian film Daughter of the Jungle.

Some sources say the name means “happiness” or having a good time in Hawaiian. It might also be a feminine version of the Albanian name Luàn, meaning “lion”. It might also be used as a combination of the names Louise or Lucy and Anna. It might be derived from the Spanish word “luan”, meaning a shade between yellow and brown, or as a feminine form of the name Luanus.

People 
 Luana Anders (1938-1996), American actress and screenwriter.
 Luàna Bajrami (born 2001), Kosovan-French actress and film maker
 Luana Bertolucci Paixão, a Brazilian football player.
 Luana Carolina, Brazilian mixed martial artist.
 Countess Luana of Orange-Nassau, Jonkvrouwe van Amsberg, member of the Dutch royal family.
 Luana Patten (1938-1996) American actress.
 Luana Piovani, Brazilian actress and former model.
 Luana Tanaka, Brazilian actress.
 Luana Walters (1912-1963), American actress.
 Luana Volnovich, Argentine politician.
 Luana Zanella (born 1950), Italian politician.

Places 
 Luana, Iowa, town in Iowa named in honor of the founder's wife.

Notes 

Feminine given names